Admiral Frank Sotheron (1765–1839) was Member of Parliament for Nottinghamshire in the Parliament of the United Kingdom in the early 1800s.

See also

References 

Nottinghamshire
1765 births
1839 deaths
Members of the Parliament of the United Kingdom for English constituencies
UK MPs 1812–1818
UK MPs 1818–1820
UK MPs 1820–1826
UK MPs 1826–1830
UK MPs 1830–1831
Royal Navy admirals